The 1969 Wills Open British Covered Court Championships – Men's singles was an event of the 1969 Wills Open British Covered Court Championships tennis tournament and was played on indoor carpet courts at the Wembley Arena in London in the United Kingdom between 17 November and 22 November 1969. The draw consisted of 32 players. Ken Rosewall was the reigning singles champion but did not take part in this edition. Rod Laver won the singles title by defeating Tony Roche in the final, 6–4, 6–1, 6–3.

Draw

Finals

Top half

Bottom half

References

External links
 ITF tournament edition details

Wembley Championships